Review and Herald may refer to either of the following Seventh-day Adventist entities:

 Adventist Review, the official church newspaper, formerly known as the Review and Herald
 Review and Herald Publishing Association, one of two major Seventh-day Adventist publishing houses in North America